Claudio Capone (18 November 1952 – 23 June 2008) was an Italian actor, voice actor and narrator.

Biography
Born in Rome, Capone began an acting career on television at the age of 11. His first on screen appearance was in Il giornalino di Gian Burrasca directed by Lina Wertmüller. He also worked on stage alongside Luigi Almirante, Silvio Noto and Roldano Lupi. He devoted himself exclusively to dubbing and narrating in the 1970s.

Capone's most notable roles include the dubbing of Ridge Forrester in the Italian version of The Bold and the Beautiful, and Stephen Collins as the Rev. Eric Camden in 7th Heaven. Previously, he was also the voice of Luke Skywalker (portrayed by Mark Hamill) in the Star Wars original trilogy and as Carey Mahoney (portrayed by Steve Guttenberg) in the Police Academy franchise, the voice of Stephen Fry, who played Oscar Wilde in the film Wilde, Franz Joseph I of Austria in the Sissi trilogy, and Don Johnson in the programme Miami Vice.

As a popular film and television program narrator, he was the narrator of many documentaries on the Italian national television network RAI, but none more so than his narration of Rai's scientific documentary Superquark, presented by Piero Angela and Geo & Geo. His voice (and often his image) can be seen and heard in many national and local advertising campaigns in Italy.

Personal life
Capone was married with two children. His son Davide is also a voice actor.

Death
Capone died of a stroke on 23 June 2008, at the age of 55, while in Scotland on business. He had been assisting with creating a documentary at the time. Two days before his death, he became extremely ill. Because of this, he had to be transported from Crieff to a nearby hospital in Perth where he died.

Dubbing roles

Animation
Bow in He-Man and She-Ra: The Secret of the Sword

Live action
Luke Skywalker in Star Wars: Episode IV – A New Hope
Luke Skywalker in Star Wars: Episode V – The Empire Strikes Back
Luke Skywalker in Star Wars: Episode VI – Return of the Jedi
Carey Mahoney in Police Academy
Carey Mahoney in Police Academy 2: Their First Assignment
Carey Mahoney in Police Academy 3: Back in Training
Carey Mahoney in Police Academy 4: Citizens on Patrol
Ridge Forrester in The Bold and the Beautiful
James "Sonny" Crockett in Miami Vice
Nash Bridges in Nash Bridges
Oscar Wilde in Wilde
Eric Camden in 7th Heaven
Curt Henderson in American Graffiti
Kit Carruthers in Badlands
Sean Archer in Face/Off
Franz Joseph I in Sissi (television redub)
Franz Joseph I Sissi – The Young Empress (television redub)
Franz Joseph I Sissi – Fateful Years of an Empress (television redub)
Loomis Birkhead in 1941
Andrei Sobinski in To Be or Not to Be
Egon Spengler in Ghostbusters II
John Winger in Stripes
Basil Exposition in Austin Powers: International Man of Mystery
Red in Britannia Hospital
Lester in Crimes and Misdemeanors
Ted in Manhattan Murder Mystery
Bob Dandridge In Everyone Says I Love You
George Malley in Phenomenon

References

External links
 
 
 
 

1952 births
2008 deaths
Male actors from Rome
Italian male voice actors
Italian male television actors
Italian male stage actors
Italian male child actors
20th-century Italian male actors
21st-century Italian male actors